The Waiuku and Mission Bush Branches are two branches on the New Zealand railway network which are closely linked. The Mission Bush Branch connects the North Island Main Trunk railway to the Glenbrook Steel Mill.

History
Proposed as early as 1880, and surveyed along a more southerly alignment in 1883, the branch line to Waiuku was finally authorised in 1912, following the election of William Massey, the local MP for Waiuku, as Prime Minister. The first sod was turned on 19 February 1914, in a ceremony at Waiuku. Progress was slow, and the branch did not open until 5 January 1922, with more work to finish until the line was fully open. The line was not very profitable, and passenger services were withdrawn on 17 July 1948, being replaced by buses.

In 1966 it was announced a new  spur line would be built from Glenbrook to the New Zealand Steel steel mill at Mission Bush. Traffic continued to decline, until the line was closed on 31 December 1967 to Waiuku. The construction of the steel mill was the line's saviour. The spur line to the steel mill was opened on 7 October 1968.

The remaining section from Glenbrook to Waiuku was in the process of being lifted until it was taken over by the Glenbrook Vintage Railway. The line has been extended into Waiuku following the old branch as far as the last curve where it deviates. The line presently terminates at Victoria Avenue in Waiuku, a short walk from the centre of the town, with plans the eventually terminate the line at the Tamakai reserve, next to the old wharf.

The extension to Victoria Ave was completed by Easter of 2010 with the first passenger carrying train running on the line on 3 April 2010, hauled by JA 1250. The extension was officially opened to the public on Labour Weekend (23 October 2010) by Kevin Lawrence, former Waiuku Borough Mayor, and Len Brown, Mayor of Auckland.

Services
Services currently consist of five trains per day. Inbound trains include bulk lime and coal trains, outbound trains carry export steel to the Port of Tauranga.

References

Citations

Bibliography

 
 Hermann, Bruce J; North Island Branch Lines p 11 (2007, New Zealand Railway and Locomotive Society Wellington) 

Railway lines in New Zealand
Rail transport in the Auckland Region
3 ft 6 in gauge railways in New Zealand